The knockout stage of the 2019 Copa América began on 27 June 2019 with the quarter-finals and ended on 7 July 2019 with the final at the Estádio do Maracanã in Rio de Janeiro.

All match times listed are local, BRT (UTC−3).

Format
In the knockout stage, if a match was tied after 90 minutes:
In the quarter-finals, extra time was not played, and the match was decided by a penalty shoot-out.
In the semi-finals, third place play-off and final, extra time would be played (two periods of 15 minutes each), where each team was allowed to make a fourth substitution. If still tied after extra time, the match would be decided by a penalty shoot-out.

CONMEBOL set out the following matchups for the quarter-finals:
 Match 1: Winners Group A vs 3rd Group B/C
 Match 2: Runners-up Group A vs Runners-up Group B
 Match 3: Winners Group B vs Runners-up Group C
 Match 4: Winners Group C vs 3rd Group A/B

Combinations of matches in the quarter-finals
The specific match-ups involving the third-placed teams depended on which two third-placed teams qualified for the quarter-finals:

Qualified teams
The top two placed teams from each of the three groups, along with the two best-placed third teams, qualified for the knockout stage.

Bracket

Quarter-finals

Brazil vs Paraguay

Venezuela vs Argentina

Colombia vs Chile

Uruguay vs Peru

Semi-finals

Brazil vs Argentina

Chile vs Peru

Third place play-off

Final

Notes

References

External links
 
 Copa América Brasil 2019, CONMEBOL.com

Knockout stage